Nashik-Trimbakeshwar Simhastha is a Hindu religious mela held every 12 years in the Nashik district of Maharashtra, India. The name of the festival is also transliterated as Sinhastha or Singhastha. It is one of the four fairs traditionally recognized as Kumbha Melas, and is also known as Nashik-Trimbak Kumbha Mela or Nashik Kumbha Mela.

The fair involves ritual bathing on the banks of Godavari river, at the Trimbakeshwar Shiva Temple (in Trimbak) and the Ram Kund in Nashik. Until 1789, the fair was held only at Trimbak, but after a clash between Vaishnavites and Saivites, the Maratha Peshwa segregated the Vaishnavites to the Nashik city.

History

Origins 

According to Hindu mythology, Vishnu dropped drops of amrita (the drink of immortality) at four places, while transporting it in a kumbha (pot). These four places, including Nashik, are identified as the present-day sites of the Kumbh Mela. The age of the Nashik-Trimbak Simhastha is uncertain, but its association with the kumbha myth is relatively recent, dating back to the 20th century. The Nasik District Gazetteer published during the 19th century does not mention the term "Kumbh Mela" to describe the local Simhastha fair. The earliest extant texts that contain the name "Kumbha Mela" are Khulasat-ut-Tawarikh (1695 CE) and Chahar Gulshan (1789 CE). Both these texts use the term "Kumbh Mela" to describe only the Haridwar Kumbh Mela, although they mention the Simhastha fair at Nashik. It appears that the Nashik Simhastha adapted the kumbh (and the name Kumbh Mela) from the Haridwar Kumbh Mela. The Ujjain Simhastha, in turn, is an adaptation of the Nashik-Trimbak Simhastha: it began in the 18th century, when the Maratha ruler Ranoji Shinde invited ascetics from Nashik to Ujjain for a local festival.

Mughal era 

The Khulasat-ut-Tawarikh (1695 CE) mentions the mela in its description of the Berar Subah, although it doesn't use the terms "Kumbh Mela" or "Simhastha" to describe it. It states that when Jupiter entered Leo or Simha (which happens once in 12 years), people from far away would come to Trimbak for a large gathering which was famous in all parts of the Mughal Empire.

Maratha era 

Until 1789, the fair was originally held at Trimbak, a town near the Nashik city. That year, a clash happened between Shaivite sanyasis and Vaishnavite bairagis over order of precedence of bathing, which indicated the status of the akharas. A copperplate inscription of the Maratha Peshwa claims that 12,000 ascetics died in this clash. As a result, the Peshwa shifted the Vaishnavites' bathing place to Ramkund in the Nashik city. The Shaivites continue to regard Trimbak as the proper location of the fair.

British era 

In 1861 and 1872, fights erupted at Trimbak, when some Nirmala sadhus attempted to walk naked in a procession, in imitation of a rival sect. Their rivals, as well as the British managers who wanted to keep peace, opposed them. The British administration proposed banning public nudity at the next Simhastha, but the proposal was opposed by the Naga sadhus and ultimately rejected by the British authorities.

Independent India 

When the Kumbh Mela was held in Nashik, India, from 27 July to 7 September 2003, 39 pilgrims (28 women and 11 men) were trampled to death and 57 were injured. Devotees had gathered on the banks of the Godavari river for the maha snaanam or holy bath. Over 30,000 pilgrims were being held back by barricades in a narrow street leading to the Ramkund, a holy spot, so the sadhus could take the first ceremonial bath. Reportedly, a sadhu threw some silver coins into the crowd and the subsequent scramble led to the stampede.

In 2015, the Kumbha Mela was held at Nashik-Trimbak during July–September.

With nearly 30 million devotees gathered in 2015, the mela gave a unique opportunity to test out a range of smart solutions. One of the projects conducted here was by MIT, called the "Kumbhathon", that tried to identify ways to improve crowd and civic management during intense periods of mass migration

Dates 

The Nashik-Trimbakeshwar Simhastha is held once in 12 years. The exact dates are determined according to a combination of zodiac positions: the mela ay be held when Jupiter is in Leo (Simha in Hindu astrology); or when Jupiter, Sun and Moon are in Cancer on lunar conjunction (Amavasya).

The last fair was held in 2015; the next one will be held in 2027.

References

Bibliography 
 कुम्भ मेला और साधु समागम- अमरत्व की खोज : बद्री नारायण एवं केदार नारायण पिल्ग्रिम्स पब्लिशिंग्स, (भारत) 2010, 
 Kumbh Mela and The Sadhus – The Quest for Immortality; Authors: Badri Narain and Kedar Narain PILGRIMS PUBLISHINGS, (INDIA) 2010

External links 

 Official website

Kumbh Mela
Nashik district
August observances
September observances
Hindu festivals